Lara Schmidt (born 13 October 1999) is a German tennis player.

Schmidt has a career-high WTA singles ranking of 838, achieved on 22 April 2019.

She made her WTA Tour main-draw debut at the 2018 Nürnberger Versicherungscup in the doubles draw, partnering Jule Niemeier.

External links
 
 

1999 births
Living people
German female tennis players